Charles Dawe (February 28, 1845 – March 29, 1908) was a merchant and political figure in Newfoundland. He represented Harbour Grace from 1878 to 1889 and Port de Grave from 1893 to 1900 and from 1906 to 1908 as a Conservative.

He was born in Port de Grave. Dawe was a sealing captain and operated a fishery supply business in Bay Roberts with his brother Azariah. He was a Liberal supporter until 1885. He served in the province's Executive Council as a minister without portfolio in 1894 and from 1897 to 1889. Dawe was defeated when he ran for reelection in 1889. He was elected in a 1906 by-election and served as leader of the Conservatives until he retired from politics in 1908. Dawe died in St. John's in 1908.

References

External links 
 

Members of the Newfoundland and Labrador House of Assembly
1845 births
1908 deaths
Newfoundland Colony people
Dominion of Newfoundland politicians